The Twenty-fourth Oklahoma Legislature was a meeting of the legislative branch of the government of Oklahoma, composed of the Oklahoma Senate and the Oklahoma House of Representatives. The state legislature met in regular session at the Oklahoma State Capitol in Oklahoma City from January 6 to May 6, 1953, during the term of Governor Johnston Murray. James C. Nance became the first two-term Speaker of the Oklahoma House of Representatives.

Dates of session
January 6 to May 6, 1953
Previous: 23rd Legislature • Next: 25th Legislature

Party composition

Senate

House of Representatives

Leadership

Senate
Lieutenant Governor James E. Berry served as President of the Senate, giving him a tie-breaking vote. Raymond D. Gary, a future governor, served as President pro tempore of the Oklahoma Senate.

House of Representatives
James C. Nance was elected by his fellow state representatives to serve as Speaker of the Oklahoma House of Representatives and James E. Douglas was elected as Speaker Pro Tempore. Glen Ham served as the Majority Floor Leader and C. R. Nixon served as the Republican Minority leader.

Eddie Higgins was the Chief Clerk of the Oklahoma House of Representatives.

Members

Senate

Table based on 2005 Oklahoma Almanac.

House of Representatives

Table based on government database.

References

Oklahoma legislative sessions
1953 in Oklahoma
1954 in Oklahoma
1953 U.S. legislative sessions
1954 U.S. legislative sessions